Miguel Angel Montes de Oca (born April 4, 1982 in Buenos Aires, Argentina) is an Argentine footballer currently playing for Deportivo Español of the Primera C in Argentina.

Teams
  Deportivo Español 2003-2008
  San Marcos de Arica 2009
  General Lamadrid 2010
  Deportivo Español 2011–present

References
 

1982 births
Living people
Argentine footballers
Argentine expatriate footballers
Deportivo Español footballers
San Marcos de Arica footballers
Primera B de Chile players
Expatriate footballers in Chile
Association footballers not categorized by position
Footballers from Buenos Aires